Parliament of Flanders may refer to:
 The present-day Flemish Parliament (Flanders being northern Belgium)
 , a parlement in the French Ancien Régime